Allsvenskan is the highest league of Swedish football for men. Allsvenskan (the all Swedish) is also the name of several Swedish sport leagues:

 Damallsvenskan, highest women's football league
 Allsvenskan (bandy), second highest bandy league since the 2007–08 season
 Allsvenskan and Elitserien (bandy), combined highest bandy leagues until the 2007–08 season
 Allsvenskan (men's handball), second highest men's handball league
 Allsvenskan (women's handball), second highest women's handball league
 Allsvenskan (rugby), highest rugby league
 HockeyAllsvenskan, second highest ice hockey league
 Allsvenskan (speedway), the second highest speedway league
 Superallsvenskan, defunct ice hockey league
 Allsvenskan play-offs, a Swedish football cup held to decide the Swedish football champions between 1982 and 1990